Abuja Connection is a 2003 Nollywood action film thriller directed by Michael Ezeanyaeche and starring Clarion Chukwura-Abiola. There were two other parts, Abuja Connection 2 and Abuja Connection 3, both directed by Adim Williams.

Plot
The film reflects on the struggle for Power, Money and how having the influential connections in Abuja, the capital of Nigeria, can bridge the line between poverty and wealth. Jennifer and Sophia are rivals in this game, they happen to belong to the same clan and have inside information of each other's mission. However, Jennifer is far ahead of the game. She always defeats Sophia. Sophia is now fed up with the humiliation, she decides to stop the rivalry and look for Money and Power elsewhere. Will she succeed? Or has Jennifer finally won the Battle?

Cast
Emeka Ani
Clarion Chukwura-Abiola
Sandra Ejikeme
Eucharia Anunobi
Enebeli Elebuwa
Ngozi Ezeonu
Chidi Mokeme
Chioma Okoye
Nneka Onyekwulujeikem
Tony Umole

See also
 List of Nigerian films of 2003

References

External links
 

2003 films
English-language Nigerian films
Nigerian action thriller films
2003 action thriller films
2003 comedy-drama films
2003 direct-to-video films
2000s English-language films